Luís Gustavo de Carvalho Soares (born 3 September 1968), commonly known as Luis Gustavo, is a  Brazilian former footballer who played as a midfielder.

Career
Born in Rio de Janeiro, Gustavo is a youth product of Botafogo, where he arrived as a 15-year-old. Capable of operating as a left-back or midfielder, Gustavo made his debut for the first team in 1987, helping the team win the 1989 Campeonato Carioca, without any defeats.

He joined C.S. Marítimo in 1991, and made his debut on 18 August 1991, in an away loss against S.C. Farense. He represented the Madeira-side for six years, scoring 12 goals, and having the highest number of assists in 1991 and 1992, plus being the best foreigner in 1994–95.

In 1996, the 28-year-old moved to S.L. Benfica. He made his debut on 25 August 1996, in a home draw against S.C. Braga. His period with Benfica was not so successful as before, appearing in 14 games, acting mainly as a bench player. Six months after joining Benfica, Gustavo moved on a loan deal to Cruzeiro, experiencing a good season there, winning the 1997 Copa Libertadores, and two Campeonato Mineiro.

In 1998, he was released by Benfica and joined Sport Club Internacional in the following year. There he helped the team finish runner-up in the 1999 Campeonato Gaúcho, and reach the semi-finals of the 1999 edition of Copa do Brasil. He ended his career a year later, at 32 years of age, after a spell at Rio Branco (SP).

Honours
Cruzeiro
Copa Libertadores: 1997
Campeonato Mineiro: 1997, 1998

References

External links

1968 births
Living people
Footballers from Rio de Janeiro (city)
Brazilian footballers
Botafogo de Futebol e Regatas players
C.S. Marítimo players
S.L. Benfica footballers
Cruzeiro Esporte Clube players
Sport Club Internacional players
Rio Branco Esporte Clube players
Campeonato Brasileiro Série A players
Primeira Liga players
Brazilian expatriate footballers
Expatriate footballers in Portugal
Brazilian expatriate sportspeople in Portugal
Association football midfielders